Nautilus Quarterly is a New York-based online and print science magazine. It publishes one issue on a selected topic each month on its website, releasing one chapter each Thursday. Issue topics have included human uniqueness, time, uncertainty, genius, mergers & acquisitions, and feedback. Nautilus also publishes a print edition six times a year, and a daily blog called Facts So Romantic.

Reception

In Nautilus launch year (2013), it was cited as one of Library Journal's Ten Best New Magazines Launched; was named one of the World's Best-Designed news sites by the Society for News Design; received an honorary mention as one of RealClearScience's top science news sites; and received three awards from FOLIO: magazine, including Best Consumer Website and Best Full Issue.

In 2014, the magazine won a Webby Award for best science website and was nominated for two others;  had two stories selected to be included in 2014 edition of The Best American Science and Nature Writing; won a FOLIO award for Best Standalone Digital Consumer Magazine; and was nominated for two Webby Awards.

In 2015, Nautilus won two National Magazine Awards (aka "Ellies"), for General Excellence (Literature, Science and Politics Magazines) and Best Website. It is the only magazine in the history of the award to have won multiple Ellies in its first year of eligibility. It also had one story included in the 2015 edition of The Best American Science and Nature Writing, and another story win a AAAS Kavli Science Journalism Award. RealClearScience again named it a top-10 science website.

In 2016, Nautilus had one story included in the 2016 edition of The Best American Science and Nature Writing; won an American Society of Magazine Editor's Award for Best Style and Design of a cover; and was nominated for a Webby Award.

In 2017, Nautilus had three stories selected for inclusion in the 2017 edition of The Best American Science and Nature Writing; had one piece win a AAAS Kavli Science Journalism Award; and was a Webby Award Nominee for Best Editorial Writing.

Over a dozen Nautilus illustrations have been recognized by American Illustration, Spectrum, and the Society of Illustrators.

Contributors

Since the magazine's launch in April 2013, contributors have included scientists Peter Douglas Ward, Caleb Scharf, Gary Marcus, Robert Sapolsky, David Deutsch, Lisa Kaltenegger, Jim Davies, Laura Mersini-Houghton, Ian Tattersall, Max Tegmark, Julian Barbour, Scott Aaronson, Stephen Hsu, Martin Rees, Helen Fisher and Leonard Mlodinow; and writer/journalists Christian H. Cooper, Ayaan Hirsi Ali, Amir Aczel, Nicholas Carr, Carl Zimmer, B. J. Novak, Philip Ball, Kitty Ferguson, Jill Neimark, Alan Lightman, Tom Vanderbilt, and George Musser.

Cormac McCarthy made his non-fiction writing debut in Nautilus on 20 April 2017 with an article entitled The Kekulé Problem.

Name

The word "nautilus" has a number of meanings that are referred to in the title of the magazine. "'The nautilus is so steeped in math and myth and story, from Verne to the Golden Mean to the spectacular sea creature itself,' [Nautilus publisher John] Steele said, 'that it seemed a fitting namesake for the idea of connecting and illuminating science.'"

Controversy 
On 13 December 2017, twenty of Nautilus freelance writers published "An Open Letter from Freelancers at Nautilus Magazine" in the National Writers Union, alleging that the company was in arrears to them for $50,000 for unpaid work. They announced that ten of them had joined the NWU in order "to pursue a group non-payment grievance with legal action if necessary". On 15 December 2017, the Nautilus Publisher, John Steele, published a reply explaining the magazine's financial situation and taking responsibility for the late payments. On 1 February 2018, the National Writers Union announced it had reached a settlement with Steele.

On 7 November 2019, the National Writers Union announced in a letter that NautilusThink, and its parent Nautilus Next, still owe $186,000 to former contributors.

Partnerships

On 20 March 2018, Nautilus announced a marketing partnership with Kalmbach Media, publisher of Discover and Astronomy magazines. At the time of the partnership, the three magazines had a combined reach of 10 million users.

See Also 

 Aeon (magazine)
 Quanta Magazine

References

External links 
 

Online magazines published in the United States
Magazines established in 2013
Popular science magazines
American science websites
Bimonthly magazines published in the United States
Science and technology magazines published in the United States
Magazines published in New York City